Gökçeler is a village (administratively a neighborhood) in the Milas district of Muğla Province, Turkey.

Population of Gökçeler is 271 as of 2012.

Gökçeler Canyon and İncirliin Cave inside the canyon are visitor attractions next to the village.

References

Milas
Villages in Muğla Province